Fernando Julien (born 18 May 1986) is a Mexican professional football forward, who played for Chiapas in Primera División de México.

References

External links
 
 Televisa Deportes profile: Fernando Julien Freire

1986 births
Chiapas F.C. footballers
Footballers from Mexico City
Living people
Mexican footballers
Association football forwards